The Oaks is a historic home located near Kents Store, Fluvanna County, Virginia.  It was built between about 1809 and 1830.  The rear ell is the original section, and is a two-story, brick structure. In 1830 the brick, single pile, two-story structure over a raised basement was built onto the south. The house has a slate covered gable roof.  A small one-story weatherboard addition was built onto the rear about 1915. Also on the property are the contributing outdoor kitchen (later used as a schoolroom), a smokehouse, an icehouse, a latticed covered well, a barn, and the large Richardson/Bowles family cemetery.

It was listed on the National Register of Historic Places in 2001.

References

Houses on the National Register of Historic Places in Virginia
Federal architecture in Virginia
Houses completed in 1830
Houses in Fluvanna County, Virginia
National Register of Historic Places in Fluvanna County, Virginia
1830 establishments in Virginia